Mehdi Mir Kheiri (born February 11, 1983 is an Iranian footballer who currently plays for Padideh in the Iranian Premier League.

Club career

Kheiri joined Saipa F.C. in 2009.

Club career statistics

 Assist Goals

References

1983 births
Living people
Iranian footballers
Saipa F.C. players
F.C. Aboomoslem players
PAS Hamedan F.C. players
Saba players
Naft Tehran F.C. players
Shahr Khodro F.C. players
Esteghlal Khuzestan players
People from Babol
Association football midfielders
Sportspeople from Mazandaran province